VoluMill is Computer Aided Manufacturing software developed by Celeritive Technologies that produces a toolpath designed for High Speed Machining applications. These applications include all 2-axis and 3-axis rough milling tasks, from simple prismatic parts to complex freeform molds. VoluMill is offered as a standalone version called VoluMill Universal, which is designed to work with any CAM system, and also as integrated versions that run inside hyperMILL, GibbsCAM, BobCAD-CAM, SigmaNEST, Mastercam, and NX (Unigraphics),RTM (Lemoine Technologies)

VoluMill was created to address the four problem areas of traditional toolpaths:

 The initial full cut into the material
 Stepping over between cuts
 Feeding into new areas of the part
 Overloading in corners

See also
 Computer-aided manufacturing

References

External links
 Official VoluMill Website from Celeritive

Computer-aided manufacturing software